Frank J. Hanna III is an American entrepreneur, merchant banker and philanthropist. He was one of three entrepreneurs profiled in the Acton Institute and PBS documentary film The Call of the Entrepreneur.

Hanna has been described as "one of the leading Catholic philanthropists in the USA."

Education and Career

Hanna was a corporate attorney with Troutman Sanders, a multi city law firm headquartered in Atlanta. Since 2006, he has served as CEO of the family's investment firm, Hanna Capital, LLC.

After studying at the University of Georgia, where he earned BBA and JD degrees, Hanna and his younger brother David devised a method for helping companies rid themselves of unwanted loans. This led to the brothers' founding an investment firm they later sold.

Public service

Hanna has helped start and fund two schools in Atlanta, serving on the boards of each:  Holy Spirit Preparatory School and Holy Spirit College.

Holy Spirit Prep provides an intense high-school curriculum that it claims rivals that of many four-year colleges, and has been recognized as one of the Top 50 Catholic High Schools in the country.

In addition, in 2002, Hanna was chosen by George W. Bush to be co-chair of the President's Advisory Commission on Educational Excellence for Hispanic Americans and oversaw the production and delivery of its report to the President: "From Risk to Opportunity."

Further, Hanna supports groups that promote the educational and religious liberty that he believes are critical to the nation’s future including the Federalist Society, the Becket Fund for Religious Liberty, and the Acton Institute. He also supports, serves on the board, or is otherwise affiliated with the American Enterprise Institute, Ethics and Public Policy Center, the Institute for Marriage and Public Policy, and The Philanthropy Roundtable.

Catholic service

Hanna has spoken to Catholic leaders at conferences at the Vatican and has often been a featured guest on local and national media programs.

He is the founder and currently a director of The Solidarity Association, an Association of the Christian Faithful established with the approval and guidance of the late Archbishop John F. Donoghue.   The Association seeks to strengthen and renew the Church by assisting in critical missions within the Church for which others may not be equipped.  Although the Solidarity Association is best known for its purchase and donation of the Mater Verbi (Hanna) Papyrus (portions of the Bodmer Papyri) to the Vatican Apostolic Library, it also devotes itself, in particular, to the causes of Catholic education, evangelization, and Catholic formation.

Hanna serves (or has served) on the boards of the EWTN, and the Institute for Psychological Sciences. He is currently on the advisory boards of the Catholic Leadership Institute, Seton Education Partners, The Sanctuary of Culture Foundation, and the Busch School of Business of the Catholic University of America.

He also supports or is otherwise affiliated with FOCUS (the Fellowship of Catholic University Students), Lumen Institute, the Pontifical North American College, and Sophia Institute Press.

The Bodmer Papyrus

By means of The Solidarity Association, Hanna obtained from the Bodmer Foundation in Cologny, Switzerland, portions of the 14-15 Bodmer Papyri (P75), dating from between A.D. 175 and 225. The papyrus includes the oldest extant copy of portions of the Gospels of Luke and John as well as the oldest transcription of the "Our Father." In January 2007, Hanna presented the papyrus to Pope Benedict XVI in a ceremony at the Vatican.

"The papyrus contains about half of each of the Gospels of Luke and John. It was written in Egypt and perhaps used as a liturgical book," explained Cardinal Tauran, an archivist and librarian. In the future, excerpts may be put on display for the general public.

What Your Money Means
Published in 2008, What Your Money Means (And How to Use It Well),
which lays out paradigms for a fruitful and genuine ethical engagement with wealth and delineates prudent, efficient philanthropic strategies.

In it, Hanna turns to the wisdom of various ages and cultures to affirm the fundamental premise that no matter how much of the goods of the earth we may acquire individually, we are never more than stewards of those goods, called to use them for our own good and the good of others.

About this book, Tom Monaghan, founder of Domino's Pizza said "I highly recommend this book to everyone who plans to engage in charitable giving no matter how much money they may have to give."

A Graduate's Guide to Life 
In 2017, Beacon Publishing published A Graduate's Guide to Life: Three Things They Don't Teach You in College That Could Make All the Difference.

In George Weigel's First Things magazine article, "The Summer Reading List", he notes that the book "offers those just getting started in life nuggets of wisdom, drawn from the experience of a successful Catholic entrepreneur and generous philanthropist."

Honours

Orders 
 : Knight of the Grand Cross of the Order of St. Gregory the Great by Pope Benedict XVI
 : Knight of the Order of the Holy Sepulchre
 : Knight of the Sovereign Military Order of Malta

Philanthropic 
In recognition of his decades of sustained public service in education and other fields, Frank has received the Philanthropy Roundtable's William E. Simon Prize for Philanthropic Leadership "for his national leadership in K-12 education reform", as well as the David R. Jones Award for Philanthropic Leadership awarded by The Fund for American Studies.

References

External links
 Biography
 Forbes magazine's profile of Frank J. Hanna III
 Biography at Frank-J-Hanna.com
 A family of entrepreneurs
 Frank Hanna Interview with The Philanthropy Roundtable
 Updates on Past Simon Prize Winners 2001–2013: Frank Hanna
 

1960s births
Date of birth missing (living people)
Living people
Businesspeople from Atlanta
Terry College of Business alumni
American financial businesspeople
American Roman Catholics
Knights of Malta
Roman Catholic activists
American Enterprise Institute
Knights Grand Cross of the Order of St Gregory the Great
Knights of the Holy Sepulchre
Acton Institute
University of Georgia School of Law alumni